Springdale is a village community in the central north part of the Riverina region of the Australian state of New South Wales. It is situated by road, about 3 kilometres east of Combaning and 23 kilometres north west of Stockinbingal.

Springdale Post Office opened on 1 November 1897 and closed in 1977. A railway station on the branch line to Lake Cargelligo served the community between 1893 and 1975.

Gallery

Springdale railway station

References

Towns in the Riverina
Towns in New South Wales
Temora Shire